The 2016 Mid-American Conference men's soccer tournament was the 23rd edition of the tournament. It determined the Mid-American Conference's automatic berth into the 2016 NCAA Division I Men's Soccer Championship.

Qualification 

The top four teams in the Mid-American Conference based on their conference regular season records qualified for the tournament.  Akron, Bowling Green, Buffalo, and Western Michigan earned berths into the tournament.

Bracket

Schedule

Semifinals

MAC Championship

Statistical leaders

Top goalscorers 

9 goals scored by 9 players.

Tournament Best XI 
Nick Hinds, Akron

Stuart Holthusen, Akron

Adam Najem, Akron

Brad Ruhakk, Akron

Jacob Roth, Bowling Green

Pat Flynn, Bowling Green

Joseph Kuta, Buffalo

Fox Slotemaker, Buffalo

Russell Cicerone, Buffalo

Edu jimenez, Western Michigan

Hunter Vandenboom, Western Michigan

See also 
 Mid-American Conference Men's Soccer Tournament
 2016 Mid-American Conference men's soccer season
 2016 NCAA Division I men's soccer season
 2016 NCAA Division I Men's Soccer Championship

References 

tournament 2016
Mid-American Conference Men's Soccer